Giant's Grave may refer to:

Giant's Grave, Cumbria, two standing stones near Black Combe, Cumbria
Giants' Graves, Arran, two Neolithic chambered tombs on the Isle of Arran in Scotland
Giants' grave, a type of Sardinian megalithic gallery grave built during the Bronze Age by the Nuragic civilization
Giant's Grave, Northern Ireland, an archaeological site in County Antrim
Giant's Grave, a district within the Briton Ferry West electoral ward, Neath Port Talbot, Wales
"Giant's Grave", a folk song about the docks at Briton Ferry
Giant's Grave, a feature of the prehistoric site at Parc Cwm long cairn, Swansea, Wales
Giants Grave F.C., an amateur Welsh football team based in Giant's Grave, Neath Port Talbot, Wales
Giant's Grave, Primrose Hill Park, a tumulus in Coventry